Donald or Don Partridge may refer to

Donald B. Partridge (1891–1946), American politician
Don Partridge (footballer) (1925–2003), English footballer
Don Partridge (1941–2010), English singer and songwriter